Anorthodes indigena is a species of cutworm or dart moth in the family Noctuidae first described by William Barnes and Foster Hendrickson Benjamin in 1925. It is found in North America.

The MONA or Hodges number for Anorthodes indigena is 9652.

References

Further reading

 
 
 

Caradrinini
Articles created by Qbugbot
Moths described in 1925